Lon Gisland is an EP by Beirut, released on CD by Ba Da Bing! Records in January 2007 and on single-sided 12" LP by Chouette Records.

It is a follow-up to the critically acclaimed Gulag Orkestar and the first album performed by the full band, which came together after Gulag Orkestars release. Lon Gisland includes a reworked version of "Scenic World", from Beirut's previous album. The EP’s title does not refer to a person named Lon Gisland, but is instead a play on the place-name “Long Island.”

Reception

Pitchfork Media's Brandon Stosuy gave Lon Gisland a positive review, calling Condon's decision to play with a full band a "smart move". Stosuy ended his review by writing: "It seems Condon's getting all this-- by embracing the developments, he's started to go beyond chewing the scenery to, well, actually living in it".

Track listing

The EP's version of "Scenic World" differs from the first in that it has a slower, stronger sound and is entirely acoustic, with a violin and accordion replacing the original MIDI keyboard.

Personnel
The following people contributed to Lon Gisland:

Beirut
 Perrin Cloutier - Accordion, Cello
 Ryan Condon - Composer
 Zach Condon - Composer, Mixing, Piano, Trumpet, Ukulele, Vocals
 Kristin Ferebee - Violin
 Jon Natchez - Clarinet, Glockenspiel, Sax (Baritone), Ukulele
 Nick Petree - Percussion
 Kelly Pratt - Euphonium, Flugelhorn, Trumpet

Additional personnel
 Rob Carmichael - Design, Layout Design
 Josh Clark - Engineer
 Paul Johnson - Mixing
 Adam Nunn - Mastering

Charts

References

2007 EPs
Beirut (band) albums
Ba Da Bing Records albums